The Crimson Circle is a 1936 British crime film directed by Reginald Denham and starring Hugh Wakefield, Alfred Drayton, and Niall MacGinnis. It is based on the 1922 novel The Crimson Circle by Edgar Wallace. It was made by the independent producer Richard Wainwright at Shepperton and Welwyn Studios.

Plot
Detectives at Scotland Yard try to track down The Crimson Circle, a secret society of blackmailers.

Earlier versions
There was a British silent version in 1922; and a previous UK/German co-production of The Crimson Circle, produced in the De Forest Phonofilm sound-on-film system, which was trade-shown in London in March 1929, along with an early sound version of Wallace's The Clue of the New Pin.

Cast
 Hugh Wakefield as Derek Yale
 Alfred Drayton as Insp. Parr
 Niall MacGinnis as Jack Beardmore
 June Duprez as Sylvia Hammond
 Paul Blake as Sgt. Webster
 Noah Beery as Felix Marl
 Basil Gill as James Beardmore
 Gordon McLeod as Brabazon
 Renee Gadd as Millie Macroy
 Ralph Truman as Lawrence Fuller
 Robert Rendel as Commissioner
 William Hartnell as Minor role

Critical reception
The New York Times wrote, "after the first five minutes or so of the Globe's current thriller from England, it may occur to you that the title, The Crimson Circle, is a matter of slight understatement. Please remember, then, that this is an Inspector Parr story, and that British producers do not presume to change Edgar Wallace titles, no matter how much more fitting something like The Gory Horde may seem. Anyway, after the first five minutes you will become reconciled to this omnibus of 'omicide, remembering, if you know your Edgar Wallace, that a dozen murders is about Parr for the course."

References

Bibliography
 Low, Rachael. Filmmaking in 1930s Britain. George Allen & Unwin, 1985.
 Wood, Linda. British Films, 1927-1939. British Film Institute, 1986.

External links

1936 films
British crime films
1936 crime films
1930s English-language films
Films directed by Reginald Denham
Films based on British novels
Films based on works by Edgar Wallace
Films shot at Shepperton Studios
Films shot at Welwyn Studios
Films set in London
British black-and-white films
1930s British films